Martin Marietta Materials, Inc. is an American company and a member of the S&P 500 Index. The company is a supplier of aggregates and heavy building materials, with operations spanning 26 states, Canada and the Caribbean. In particular, Martin Marietta Materials supplies resources for the construction of roads, sidewalks and foundations.

History
The present-day materials business is distantly descended from Superior Stone, an aggregates company founded in 1939 in Raleigh, North Carolina. In 1959, the company was purchased by the American-Marietta Corporation, which merged with the Glenn L. Martin Company a year later to form the Martin Marietta Corporation. In 1971, Martin Marietta acquired Harvey Aluminum, a company which made aluminum oxide, aluminum ingot and aircraft grade aluminum metal sheet. Martin Marietta with Lockheed Corporation in 1995, and a year later, Martin Marietta Materials was spun off as independent company, with Lockheed Martin retaining various aerospace, defense, and other manufacturing lines of business.

Martin Marietta's Magnesia Specialties business provides a full range of magnesium oxide, magnesium hydroxide and dolomitic lime products.

References

External links
 
 Martin Marietta Magnesia Specialties

Companies listed on the New York Stock Exchange
Manufacturing companies based in North Carolina
Chemical companies of the United States
Mining companies of the United States
Manufacturing companies established in 1993
Companies based in Raleigh, North Carolina
Building materials companies of the United States
Corporate spin-offs